The Moron (1,337 m) is a mountain of the Jura, located north of Malleray in the canton of Bern.

East of the summit is located a  observation tower designed by Mario Botta.

References

External links

Moron on Hikr

Mountains of the Jura
Mountains of Switzerland
Mountains of the canton of Bern
One-thousanders of Switzerland